James Edward Williams (born October 10, 1968) is a former American football linebacker in the National Football League. He played for the New Orleans Saints (1990–1994), the Jacksonville Jaguars (1995–1996), the San Francisco 49ers (1997–1998), and the Cleveland Browns (1999).  He played college football at Mississippi State University and was a sixth round draft choice in the 1990 NFL Draft.  He was selected by the Jacksonville Jaguars in the 1995 NFL Expansion Draft.

External links
 NFL.com player page

1968 births
Living people
American football linebackers
Cleveland Browns players
Jacksonville Jaguars players
Mississippi State Bulldogs football players
New Orleans Saints players
San Francisco 49ers players
San Jose SaberCats players
Georgia Force players
Arizona Rattlers players
Sportspeople from Natchez, Mississippi
Players of American football from Mississippi
San Francisco Demons players